Sargent and Greenleaf, more commonly known among Safe and Vault technician circles as S&G, is a U.S. company that manufactures combination locks, key-operated safe and safe deposit box locks, high security military padlocks, and associated equipment.

History
James Sargent founded the James Sargent Lock Company in 1857.  In 1864, he moved to Rochester, New York and the company was renamed Sargent and Greenleaf.

The company is currently headquartered in Nicholasville, Kentucky.  It is a subsidiary of Stanley Security Solutions.

References

External links
Official Website
Locksmith Service

American brands
Lock manufacturers
Companies established in 1856
Manufacturing companies based in Kentucky